The Naderī satī stone inscription is an epigraphic record documenting the self-immolation of a woman after the death of her husband. It has been assigned to the fifth or sixth century CE.

Location
Naderi is located in Guna District, Madhya Pradesh, India, to the south of the town of Chanderi.

Publication
The inscription has been noted by M. B. Garde, H. N. Dvivedī and M. Willis in their respective epigraphic lists.

Description and Contents
The inscription is written in Sanskrit and appears to record the satī of a woman after her husband was killed by a lion. The inscription is dated 66 or the initial numbers of the date have been omitted; palaeography suggests a date in the 5th or 6th century.

Metrics

Text

Translation

See also
Indian inscriptions

Notes

External links
 Gwalior State, Archaeological Report online

Sanskrit inscriptions in India
Gupta and post-Gupta inscriptions